Saki West is a Local Government Area in Oyo State, Nigeria. Its headquarters are in the town of Saki. Shaki, Nigeria is located at the extreme end of Oyo state. It has a ressetlement center of 2nd Mechanised division of Nigerian Army, The Oke-Ogun Polytechnic (TOPS), Technical College and a School of Command.
Shaki, Nigeria is also one of the largest city in Oyo state.

It has an area of 2,014 km and a population of 278,002 at the 2006 census.

The postal code of the area is 203.

References

Local Government Areas in Oyo State
Local Government Areas in Yorubaland